Fox Glacier Aerodrome  is a small landing strip serving tourist sightseeing and skydiving flights over the Fox Glacier and Southern Alps areas of New Zealand.

A Cessna crash on landing in September 2008 left three people hospitalised.

The airstrip was the location of an accident in September 2010  where nine people were killed when a parachuting flight crashed shortly after take-off.

See also

 List of airports in New Zealand
 List of airlines of New Zealand
 Transport in New Zealand

Notes

Airports in New Zealand
Westland District
Transport buildings and structures in the West Coast, New Zealand